USS Raccoon has been the name of more than one United States Navy ship, and may refer to:

, a patrol boat in commission from 1917 to 1919
, a tanker in commission from 1944 to 1946

Raccoon, USS